The 2004 World Championship of Ski Mountaineering was the second World Championship of Ski Mountaineering sanctioned by the International Council for Ski Mountaineering Competitions (ISMC), held in the Spanish Aran Valley (Catalonia) from March 1 to March 6, 2004.

Compared to the 2002 World Championship a relay race and a vertical race competition was added.

Results

Nation ranking and medals 
(all age groups)

Vertical race 
event held on March 2, 2004

altitude difference (ascent): 950m

List of the best 10 participants by gender (incl. "Espoirs" level):

Team 
Event held on March 3, 2004

altitude difference: 
 ascent: 2,128m
 downhill: 2,128m

List of the best 10 teams by gender:

Individual 
Event held on March 5, 2004

 distance: ~ 20 km
 altitude difference: 
 ascent: 1,720m
 downhill: 1,720m

List of the best 10 participants by gender (incl. "Espoirs" level):

Relay 
Event held on March 6, 2004

List of the best 10 relay teams by gender (some teams included "Espoirs" level athletes):

Combination ranking 
(individual, team, vertical race rankings)

List of the best 10 participants by gender:

References 

2004
World Championship Of Ski Mountaineering, 2004
International sports competitions hosted by Catalonia
World Championship Of Ski Mountaineering, 2004
Skiing competitions in Spain